Nomoto (written: 野本 or 野元) is a Japanese surname. Notable people with the surname include:

, Japanese baseball player
, Japanese basketball player
, Japanese astrophysicist and astronomer
, Japanese voice actor
, Japanese basketball player
, Japanese footballer
, Japanese footballer

Fictional characters
, a character in the manga series Killing Bites

Japanese-language surnames